Timbuk2 is a San Francisco-based bag manufacturer and marketer. The company produces a variety of pre-made and made-to-order bags. Timbuk2 is owned by private equity group TB2 Investors. In 2014, the company was ranked as the 2nd largest manufacturer in San Francisco by the San Francisco Business Times.

History

Timbuk2 was founded in 1989 by bike messenger Rob Honeycutt in a garage in San Francisco's Mission District. Honeycutt was fascinated by "just in time" manufacturing and studied the Toyota manufacturing model which led him to develop a bag pattern that was able to accommodate custom orders from independent bike dealers in San Francisco. The company was originally named Scumbags; Honeycutt changed the name to Timbuk2 Designs in 1990. The name Timbuk2 was inspired in part by the American rock band Timbuk3 and the company's swirl logo was designed by Honeycutt and is meant to mimic the rotation of a bike wheel. While its product line has since expanded beyond custom bags, Timbuk2 has continually designed and manufactured all its custom products in San Francisco's Mission neighborhood since 1989. Non-custom products are manufactured in China, Vietnam, and Indonesia.

The company launched its flagship retail store in Hayes Valley, San Francisco in 2006. In 2011, Timbuk2 launched a bicycle share program in its retail stores. In 2013, the Timbuk2 opened a retail location in Seattle, Washington. That same year, the company incorporated recycled Bike to Work banners into messenger bags and donated a portion of the profits to the San Francisco Bicycle Coalition. Patti Cazzato was appointed to the role of CEO in July 2014. That same year, the company encouraged bag owners to reuse and recycle their bags through its Timbuk2 Life Cycle program.  

Timbuk2 also added retail locations in Chicago, Denver, Los Angeles and Toronto in 2014. That same year, Timbuk2 collaborated with Blue Bottle Coffee Company to release a coffee travel kit. In July 2016, the company collaborated with the footwear company New Balance to release specially branded products. The company opened a flagship store in NoHo, Manhattan in October 2016. In June 2017, the company opened an additional location in Brooklyn. As of 2023, the Manhattan and Brooklyn locations are no longer open.

References

External links

Companies based in San Francisco
Manufacturing companies established in 1989
Retail companies established in 2006
Online retailers of the United States
Sporting goods retailers of the United States
1989 establishments in California